Cuevas del Almanzora is a municipality of Almería province, in the autonomous community of Andalusia, Spain.

Villages
 Alhanchete
 Aljarilla
 Barrio Bravo
 Burjulú
 Cala Panizo
 El Calguerín (also known as Cuevas de Vera)
 El Calón
 El Largo
 El Martinete
 El Morro
 El Realengo
 El Rulador
 El Tarahal
 El Piojo
 Grima
 Guazamara
 Jucainí
 La Algarrobina
 La Mulería
 La Portilla
 Las Canalejas
 Las Cunas
 Las Cupillas
 Los Guiraos
 Las Herrerías
 Los Lobos
 Palomares
 Pozo del Esparto
 Villaricos
 Vizcaíno
 Zutija

Demographics

See also
1966 Palomares B-52 crash

References

External links

Meteorologia en Cuevas Del Almanzora, webcam
  Cuevas del Almanzora - Sistema de Información Multiterritorial de Andalucía
  Cuevas del Almanzora - Diputación Provincial de Almería

Municipalities in the Province of Almería